Conspicuous Only in Its Absence is a live album by the American psychedelic rock band the Great Society, released in 1968 by Columbia Records.  It was their first album released and consists of recordings made during a live concert performance by the band at The Matrix club in San Francisco in 1966.  Additional recordings from the same concert were released later in 1968 on the album How It Was.  These two albums were repackaged in 1971 as a double album called Collector's Item.

Upon its initial release in 1968, Conspicuous Only in Its Absence reached No. 166 on the Billboard Top LPs chart.  A single featuring "Sally, Go 'Round the Roses" and "Didn't Think So" was released in conjunction with the album by Columbia Records but it failed to chart.

Track listing
"Sally, Go 'Round the Roses" (Lona Stevens, Zell Sanders)  – 6:32
"Didn't Think So" (Grace Slick)  – 3:23
"Grimly Forming" (Peter Vandergelder)  – 3:53
"Somebody to Love" (Darby Slick)  – 4:27
"Father Bruce" (Darby Slick, Grace Slick, Jerry Slick, David Miner)  – 3:31
"Outlaw Blues" (Bob Dylan)  – 2:27
"Often as I May" (Grace Slick)  – 3:43
"Arbitration" (Peter Vandergelder)  – 3:58
"White Rabbit" (Grace Slick)  – 6:15

Personnel
The Great Society
Grace Slick – piano, vocals, bass guitar
Darby Slick – guitar
David Miner – guitar
Jerry Slick – drums
Peter Vandergelder (van Gelder) – bass guitar, flute, saxophone
Technical
Herb Greene - photography

References

The Great Society (band) albums
1968 debut albums
1968 live albums
Columbia Records live albums